James Bennett Keene (25 October 1849 – 5 August 1919) was an Irish Anglican bishop in the Church of Ireland in the late 19th and early 20th centuries.

Keene was educated at Rathmines School and Trinity College, Dublin. He was ordained in 1879 and was the rector of Navan and headmaster of Navan College before his ordination to the episcopate as the Bishop of Meath. He died on 5 August 1919 and two years later his wife published a memorial to him.

References

1849 births
1919 deaths
People from County Meath
Alumni of Trinity College Dublin
19th-century Anglican bishops in Ireland
20th-century Anglican bishops in Ireland
Anglican bishops of Meath
People educated at Rathmines School